Gerasim Pileš (Chuvash & , February 2, 1913, Man Toktash village, Russia – November 2, 2003, Cheboksary, Chuvash Republic, Russia) – a Soviet Chuvash writer playwright, sculptor, painter.

Biography 
Pileš was born on February 2, 1913, in the village Man Toktash of the Alikovsky District, Chuvash Republic.

He studied in Bolshetoktashsky initial, Hodorsky eight-year schools, in rabfac in Nizhny Novgorod, the Moscow art technical school. Pilesh was called up for involuntary military service and took part in the Great Patriotic War. G. Harlampyev.  He worked in the Chuvash book publishing house, and worked as the director of an art gallery.

Pileš died on November 2, 2003, in Cheboksary (Chuvash Republic, Russia).

Creative activity 
Pileš came to the Chuvash literature as the master of short plays, children's stories.  Then Gerasim Dmitriyevich wrote stories and novels. At the Chuvash theaters and nowadays with pleasure put plays "Кӑмӑл уҫӑлсан" ("The desire birth"), "Ҫурхи кӗвӗсем" (Spring motives), "Юрату вилӗмсӗр" ("The love is immortal"). The drama "The love is immortal" showed on a scene of the Ukrainian state drama theater in Kiev.

Gerasim Dmitriyevich participated in art exhibitions, wrote sketches about the Chuvash artists M. Spiridonov and N. Sverchkov.

He cooperated actively with Kapkan's magazine.

Famous works 
 "Илемлӗ ир" /Beautiful morning
 "Юрату вилӗмсӗр" / Love don't die
 "Йӑлтӑр ҫӑлкуҫ" / Brilliant spring
 "Тӑрнасен ташши" / Crane's dance
 "Пӗчӗк ҫеҫ юмахсем" / Small tales
 "Иртнӗ ҫулсенче" / In past years
 "Ытарайми ҫӗршывра" / In native country
 "Вӑрман юрри" / Forest song

Literature 
 "Аликовская энциклопедия" (Alikovo District), editing: Efimov L.A., Efimov E.L., Anan'ev A. A., Terent'ev G. K., Cheboksary, 2009, .
 "Чӑваш литературин антологийӗ", editing: D. V. Gordeev, J. A. Silem, Cheboksary, 2003.  .
 П. Афанасьев, "Писатели Чувашии", Cheboksary, 2006

References

External links 
 Gerasim Pileš, biography
 Alikovsky District's news
 Chuvash republican national library
 Chuvash State Painting Museum

1913 births
2003 deaths
Chuvash writers
People from Alikovsky District